Marsais is a commune in the Charente-Maritime department in southwestern France. It also has mayoral jurisdiction over two local communes L'Hopiteau (sometimes L'Hopiteaux) and Boisse.

Population

Sports
Despite the area being small in both geographic and demographic senses, there is a local football team, playing home games at 'Le Chat d'Eau' complex. There is a bar, Le Marsaisian. which is well known in the local region for hosting pool tournaments and Baby Foot (table football) championships.

See also
 Communes of the Charente-Maritime department

References

External links
 

Communes of Charente-Maritime